The Bureau of Industry and Security (BIS) is an agency of the United States Department of Commerce that deals with issues involving national security and high technology. A principal goal for the bureau is helping stop the proliferation of weapons of mass destruction, while furthering the growth of United States exports. The Bureau is led by the Under Secretary of Commerce for Industry and Security.

The mission of the BIS is to advance U.S. national security, foreign policy, and economic interests. BIS's activities include regulating the export of sensitive goods and dual-use technologies in an effective and efficient manner; enforcing export control, anti-boycott, and public safety laws; cooperating with and assisting other countries on export control and strategic trade issues; assisting U.S. industry to comply with international arms control agreements; monitoring the viability of the U.S. defense–industrial base; and promoting federal initiatives and public-private partnerships to protect the nation's critical infrastructures.

Items on the Commerce Control List (CCL) – which includes many sensitive goods and technologies like encryption software – require a permit from the Department of Commerce before they can be exported.  To determine whether an export permit is required, an Export Control Classification Number (ECCN) is used.

Organization

The Bureau of Industry and Security, a component of the United States Department of Commerce, is organized by the United States Secretary of Commerce as follows:

Under Secretary of Commerce for Industry and Security
Deputy Under Secretary of Commerce for Industry and Security
Assistant Secretary of Commerce for Export Administration
Office of National Security and Technology Transfer Controls
Office of Nonproliferation and Treaty Compliance
Office of Strategic Industries and Economic Security
Office of Exporter Services
Office of Technology Evaluation
Assistant Secretary of Commerce for Export Enforcement
Office of Export Enforcement
Office of Enforcement Analysis
Office of Antiboycott Compliance

Guiding principles of the Bureau of Industry and Security

The main focus of the bureau is the security of the United States, which includes its national security, economic security, cyber security, and homeland security. For example, in the area of dual-use export controls, BIS administers and enforces such controls to stem the proliferation of weapons of mass destruction and the means of delivering them, to halt the spread of weapons to terrorists or countries of concern, and to further U.S. foreign policy objectives. Where there is credible evidence suggesting that the export of a dual-use item threatens U.S. security, the Bureau is empowered to prevent export of the item.

In addition to national security, BIS's function is to ensure the health of the U.S. economy and the competitiveness of U.S. industry.  BIS promotes a strong defense–industrial base that can develop and provide technologies that will enable the United States to maintain its military superiority.  BIS takes care to ensure that its regulations do not impose unreasonable restrictions on legitimate international commercial activity that are necessary for the health of U.S. industry.

Private sector collaboration

BIS works with the private sectors of the aerospace manufacturers, microprocessor, defense and other high-tech industries, which today controls a greater share of critical U.S. resources than in the past. Because the health of U.S. industry is dependent on U.S. security, BIS has formed a symbiotic relationship between industry and security, which is reflected in the formulation, application, and enforcement of BIS rules and policies.

Shifting global priorities

BIS activities and regulations also seek to adapt to changing global conditions and challenges.  The political, economic, technological, and security environment that exists today is substantially different than that of only a decade ago.  Laws, regulations, or practices that do not take into account these new global realities—and that do not have sufficient flexibility to allow for adaptation in response to future changes—ultimately harm national security by imposing costs and burdens on U.S. industry without any corresponding benefit to U.S. security.  In the area of exports, these significant geopolitical changes suggest that the U.S. control regime that in the past was primarily list-based must shift to a mix of list-based controls and controls that target specific end-uses and end-users of concern.  BIS thinks about how new technologies can be utilized in designing better export controls and enforcing controls more effectively.

BIS strives to work cooperatively with state and local government officials, first responders, and federal executive departments and agencies, including the National Security Council, Department of Homeland Security, Department of State, Department of Defense, Department of Energy, Department of Justice, and the Intelligence Community. BIS consults with its oversight committees, (the House Foreign Affairs Committee and Senate Banking, Housing, and Urban Affairs Committee) and other appropriate Members of Congress and congressional staff on matters of mutual interest.

International cooperation

International cooperation is critical to BIS's activities. The mission of promoting security depends heavily upon international cooperation with the United States's principal trading partners and other countries of strategic importance, such as major transshipment hubs.  BIS takes the viewpoint that when seeking to control the spread of dangerous goods and technologies, protecting critical infrastructures, and ensuring the existence of a strong defense industrial base, international cooperation is critical.  With regard to export control laws in particular, effective enforcement is greatly enhanced by both international cooperation and an effort to harmonize the substance of U.S. laws with those of our principal trading partners.  International cooperation, however, does not mean "settling on the lowest common denominator."  Where consensus cannot be broadly obtained, the BIS will maintain its principles, often through cooperation among smaller groups of like-minded partners.

Lists of Parties of Concern
The Bureau keeps 5 major lists updated:

The Consolidated Screening List is a searchable database maintained under a collaboration of the Departments of Commerce, State and Treasury, to aid individuals and industries which may be engaged in overseas trade to determine whether transactions involving specific persons or items are legal, or whether licensure or special records are required. 

The Entity List, which is regularly updated on both the BIS website and the Federal Register.

The Military End User List, published as a supplement to the Export Administration Regulations Section 744.

The Denied Persons List

The Unverified List

See also

 Title 15 of the Code of Federal Regulations
 Commodity Classification Automated Tracking System
 Committee on Foreign Investment in the United States

References

External links
 Bureau of Industry and Security
 Bureau of Industry and Security in the Federal Register
 Search BIS Screening List

Export and import control
United States Department of Commerce agencies
Federal law enforcement agencies of the United States